Auction Hunters is an American reality television series that premiered on November 9, 2010, on Spike.

Series overview
{| class="wikitable plainrowheaders"  style="text-align:center;"
|-
! style="padding:0px 8px;" colspan="2" rowspan="2" | Season
! style="padding:0px 8px;" rowspan="2" rowspan="2" | Episodes
! style="padding:0px 8px;" colspan="2" | Originally aired
|-
! First aired
! Last aired
|-
! scope="row" style="width:12px; background:#E97A25;"|
| 1
| 8
| style="padding:0px 8px;"| 
| style="padding:0px 8px;"| 
|-
! scope="row" style="width:12px; background:#F8D535;"|
| 2
| 27
| style="padding:0px 8px;"| 
| style="padding:0px 8px;"| 
|-
! scope="row" style="width:12px; background:#21D16D;"|
| 3
| 26
| style="padding:0px 8px;"| 
| style="padding:0px 8px;"| 
|-
! scope="row" style="width:12px; background:#1A55A1;"|
| 4
| 26
| style="padding:0px 8px;"| 
| style="padding:0px 8px;"| 
|-
! scope="row" style="width:12px; background:#A91B59;"|
| 5
| 20
| style="padding:0px 8px;"| 
| style="padding:0px 8px;"| 
|}

Episodes

Season 1 (2010)

Season 2 (2011)

Season 3 (2012)

Season 4 (2013–14)

Season 5 (2014–15)

References

Lists of American non-fiction television series episodes